Hopane is a natural chemical compound classified as a triterpene.  It forms the central core of a variety of other chemical compounds which are collectively known as hopanoids.  The first compound of the hopane family to be isolated and characterised was hydroxyhopanone, found in dammar resin. The name derives from Hopea, a tree genus from which dammar is obtained.

See also
 Bacteriohopanepolyol

References

Triterpenes
Hydrocarbons
Cyclopentanes
Isopropyl compounds